Emmanuel Tagoe (born 10 January 1989) is a Ghanaian professional boxer who held the IBO lightweight title from 2016 to 2018. As of August 2020, he is ranked as the world's ninth best active lightweight by the Transnational Boxing Rankings Board and tenth by The Ring.

Professional career
Tagoe made his professional debut on 19 June 2004, losing by fifth-round technical knockout (TKO) against Lante Addy in Accra, Ghana.

After compiling a record of 26–1 (13 KOs) he faced former world champion Mzonke Fana for the vacant IBO lightweight title on 2 December 2016 at the Bukom Boxing Arena in Accra. In a fight which saw Tagoe score two knockdowns in the first round, he went on to win via shutout unanimous decision (UD) with two judges scoring the bout 120–106 and the third scoring it 120–107. Fana collapsed in his corner after the final bell, requiring immediate medical attention from the ringside doctors. He was taken to the hospital before the results were announced.

On April 9, 2022, Tagoe lost by a wide unanimous decision after twelve rounds to Ryan Garcia at the Alamodome in San Antonio, Texas, with scores of 119-110 (twice) and 118-109 against Tagoe.

Professional boxing record

References

External links

Living people
1989 births
Boxers from Accra
Ghanaian male boxers
Featherweight boxers
Super-featherweight boxers
Lightweight boxers
International Boxing Organization champions